Below is a list of musical artists, bands, and groups that have performed on the television series MTV Unplugged.

Performances by performance date

1989
 Squeeze, Syd Straw and Elliot Easton – National Video Center, NYC, October 31
 The Smithereens and Graham Parker – National Video Center, NYC, December 13
 10,000 Maniacs and Michael Penn – National Video Center, NYC, December 13
 The Alarm and Nuclear Valdez – National Video Center, NYC, December 14
 Joe Walsh and Dr. John – National Video Center, NYC, December 14
DB730 and the Faust Bros Christmas Hits- December 25

1990
 Stevie Ray Vaughan and Joe Satriani – National Video Center, NYC, January 30
 Michelle Shocked and Indigo Girls – National Video Center, NYC, January 30
 Sinéad O'Connor and The Church – National Video Center, NYC, January 30
 Don Henley – Hollywood Center Studios, Los Angeles, March 30
 Great White and Damn Yankees – Hollywood Center Studios, Los Angeles, March 30
 Crowded House and Tim Finn – Hollywood Center Studios, Los Angeles, March 30
 Hall & Oates – Chelsea Studios, NYC, May 17
 Elton John – Chelsea Studios, NYC, May 17
 Aerosmith – Ed Sullivan Theater, NYC, August 11
 Crosby, Stills & Nash – Ed Sullivan Theater, NYC, August 11
 Ratt and Vixen – Ed Sullivan Theater, NYC, August 11
 The Black Crowes and Tesla – National Video Center, NYC, November 19
 The Allman Brothers Band – National Video Center, NYC, November 19
 Poison – National Video, NYC, November 19

1991
 The Cure – London Limehouse TV Studios, London, January 24
 Paul McCartney – London Limehouse TV Studios, London, January 25 (See also Unplugged)
 Winger and Slaughter – National Video Center, NYC, March 5
 Sting – National Video Center, NYC, March 5
 R.E.M. – Chelsea Studios, NYC, April 10 (See also Unplugged: The Complete 1991 and 2001 Sessions)
 Yo! Unplugged Rap: LL Cool J, MC Lyte, De La Soul, A Tribe Called Quest and Pop's Cool Love – Chelsea Studios, NYC, April 10
 Elvis Costello – Warner Hollywood Studios, Los Angeles, June 3

1992
 Eric Clapton – Bray Film Studios, Windsor, England, January 16 (See also Unplugged)
 Paul Simon – Kaufman Astoria Studios, Astoria, Queens, New York, March 4
 R&B Unplugged: Boyz II Men, Shanice and Joe Public – Kaufman Astoria Studios, Astoria, Queens, New York, March 16
 Mariah Carey with Trey Lorenz –  Kaufman Astoria Studios, Astoria, Queens, New York, March 16 (See also MTV Unplugged)
 Pearl Jam – Kaufman Astoria Studios, Astoria, Queens, New York, March 16 (See also MTV Unplugged)
 Queensrÿche – Warner Hollywood Studios, Los Angeles, April 27
 John Mellencamp – Warner Hollywood Studios, Los Angeles, April 27
 Joe Cocker – Montreux Jazz Festival, Montreux Casino, Montreux, Switzerland, July 2
 Annie Lennox – Montreux Jazz Festival, Montreux Casino, Montreux, Switzerland, July 3
 Eurythmics – Montreux Jazz Festival, Montreux Casino, Montreux, Switzerland, July 5
 Bruce Springsteen – Warner Hollywood Studios, Los Angeles, September 22 (See also In Concert/MTV Plugged)
 k.d. lang – Ed Sullivan Theater, NYC, December 16 (aired in 1993)
 Neil Young – Ed Sullivan Theater, NYC, December 16 (never aired ) 
 Arrested Development – Ed Sullivan Theater, NYC, December 17 (aired in 1993) (See also Unplugged)

1993
 Roxette – Stockholm Circus, Sweden, January 9
 Rod Stewart with Ronnie Wood – Universal Studios, Los Angeles, February 5 (See also Unplugged...and Seated)
 Denis Leary – Universal Studios, Los Angeles, February 6
 Uptown Unplugged: Jodeci, Father MC, Mary J. Blige, Christopher Williams and Heavy D – Universal Studios, Los Angeles, February 6
 Neil Young – Universal Studios, Los Angeles, February 7 (See also Unplugged)
 Midnight Oil – Sony Music Studios, NYC, April 20
 Spoken Word I: 99, Maggie Estep, Barry Yourgrau, Reg E. Gaines, Bob Holman, Edwin Torres and Henry Rollins – Sony Music Studios, NYC, April 20
 10,000 Maniacs with special guest David Byrne – Sony Music Studios, NYC, April 21 (See also MTV Unplugged)
 Soul Asylum w/ special guest Lulu  – Sony Music Studios, NYC, April 21
 Boom Crash Opera - Melbourne's Channel Nine studios, June 
 Duran Duran – Sony Music Studios, NYC, November 17
 Stone Temple Pilots – Sony Music Studios, NYC, November 17 (aired in 1994)
 Nirvana – with guest appearance by Meat Puppets, Sony Music Studios, NYC, November 18 (See also MTV Unplugged in New York)

1994
 Tony Bennett – Sony Music Studios, NYC, April 12 (see also MTV Unplugged: Tony Bennett)
 Spoken Word II: MC Lyte, Toby Huss, Bahiyyih Maroon, Eric Bogosian, Matthew Courtney, Hal Sirowitz, Gil Scott-Heron, Larry McDonald and Wanda Phipps – Sony Music Studios, NYC, April 13
 Spoken Word III: Max Blagg, Danny Hoch, Maggie Estep, Jim Carroll, John S. Hall and Paul Beatty – Sony Music Studios, NYC, April 13
 Lenny Kravitz – Sony Music Studios, NYC, April 14
 Page and Plant – London Studios, London, England, August 25–26 (see also No Quarter: Jimmy Page and Robert Plant Unledded)
 Los Fabulosos Cadillacs – Miami, September 29 (first Latin/Spanish Unplugged)
 Caifanes - Miami, October 28 (first Mexican Rock Unplugged)
 Björk – New York City, November 7
 Eagles – Warner Brothers Studios, Burbank, CA, November 8 (see also Hell Freezes Over)
 Bob Dylan – Sony Music Studios, NYC, November 17–18 (see also MTV Unplugged)

1995
 Hole – Brooklyn Academy of Music – Brooklyn, NY, February 14
 The Cranberries – Brooklyn Academy of Music – Brooklyn, NY, February 14
 Melissa Etheridge with Bruce Springsteen – Brooklyn Academy of Music – Brooklyn, NY, February 15
 Live – Brooklyn Academy of Music – Brooklyn, NY, February 15
 Sheryl Crow – Brooklyn Academy of Music – Brooklyn, NY, February 15
 Charly García – Miami, April 28
 Herbert Grönemeyer – Studio Babelsberg, Berlin, Germany, May 14
 Café Tacuba – Miami, May 15
 Chris Isaak – Sony Music Studios, NYC, June 9
 KISS – Sony Music Studios, NYC, August 8 (See also KISS Unplugged)
 Los Tres – Miami, September 14

1996
 Soda Stereo with Andrea Echeverri – Miami, March 12 (See also Comfort y Música Para Volar)
 Seal – Brooklyn Academy of Music, Brooklyn, NY, April 9
 Alice in Chains – Brooklyn Academy of Music, Brooklyn, NY, April 10 (See also Unplugged)
 Tori Amos – Brooklyn Academy of Music, Brooklyn, NY, April 11
 Hootie & the Blowfish – The Horseshoe (at the University of South Carolina), Columbia, South Carolina, April 19
 Illya Kuryaki and the Valderramas – Miami, April 26
 CHAGE and ASKA – The Fountain Studios, London, June 19
 Harlem Yu – The Fountain Studios, London, June
 Colonial Cousins – The Fountain Studios, London, June
 Oasis, excluding Liam Gallagher, with Noel Gallagher on lead vocals – Royal Festival Hall, London, England, August 23
 George Michael – Three Mills Studios, London, England, October 11
 Maldita Vecindad – MTV Studios, Miami, October 12

1997
 Santa Sabina – Miami Broadcast Center, Miami, Florida, April 2
 Luis Alberto Spinetta – Miami, April 19 (aired in 2004)
 The Wallflowers – Brooklyn Academy of Music, NY, May 5
 Maxwell – Brooklyn Academy of Music, NY, June 15
 Jewel – Brooklyn Academy of Music, NY, June 24
 Fiona Apple – Aired July 2
 BLACKstreet – Brooklyn Academy of Music, NY, September 3
 Aterciopelados – Miami, September 7
 Bryan Adams – Hammerstein Ballroom, NYC, September 26 (See also MTV Unplugged)
 Kenneth "Babyface" Edmonds with Eric Clapton and Stevie Wonder – New York City, October 18
 Erykah Badu – November 18

1998
 Björk (Live 'n' Loud) – MTV Studios, New York, February 22
 Los Ratones Paranoicos – MTV studios, Miami, March 11

1999
 Maná – Miami, March 10 (See also Maná MTV Unplugged)
 Shakira – Manhattan Center Studios, New York, August 12 (See also MTV Unplugged)
 Alanis Morissette - The Brooklyn Academy of Music, New York, September 18 (See also Alanis Unplugged)
 The Corrs – Ardmore Studios, Co. Wicklow, Ireland, October 5 (See also The Corrs Unplugged)
 Incubus (band) - AT&T Studios, Los Angeles, November 6

2000
 Die Fantastischen Vier – Stalactite cave in Balve in the Sauerland, Germany, September 20

2001
 R.E.M. – MTV Studios, NYC, May 21 (See also Unplugged: The Complete 1991 and 2001 Sessions)
 Hikaru Utada – Tennouzu Studio, Tokyo, Japan, June 21
 La Ley – Miami Broadcast Center, June 28
 Staind – MTV Studios, New York City, July 16 (See also MTV Unplugged)
 Lauryn Hill – MTV Studios, New York City, July 21 (See also MTV Unplugged No. 2.0)
 Alejandro Sanz – Gusman Center, Miami, October 2 (See also MTV Unplugged)
 Jay-Z with The Roots, MTV Studios, New York City, November 11 (See also Jay-Z: Unplugged)

2002
 Dashboard Confessional – MTV Studios, April 24 (See also MTV Unplugged 2.0)
 Die Ärzte – Albert-Schweitzer-Gymnasium, Hamburg, Germany, August 31 (See also Unplugged - Rock'n'Roll Realschule)

2003
 Ken Hirai – February 13
 Nickelback – MTV Studios, Bussum, Netherlands, September 16

2004
 Diego Torres – Buenos Aires, Argentina, March 4
 El Tri (CD release date: August 31, 2004) 

2005
 Hitomi Yaida – Tokyo FM, Tokyo, Japan, April 24
 Queens of the Stone Age – SilverWings, Berlin, Germany, June 10
 Giorgia – June 20 (aired April 29)
 Alicia Keys – Brooklyn Academy of Music, NY, July 14 (See also Unplugged)
 Die Toten Hosen – Burgtheater, Vienna, Austria, September 1–2 (See also Nur zu Besuch: Unplugged im Wiener Burgtheater)

2006
 Ricky Martin – Miami, August 17 (See also MTV Unplugged)
 Kayah – Toya film studio, Lodz, Poland, November 28 (See also MTV Unplugged)
 Korn, with guest appearance by Amy Lee of Evanescence, and Robert Smith and Simon Gallup of The Cure – MTV Studios, NYC, December 9 (See also MTV Unplugged: Korn)

2007
 Hey – September 10
 Bon Jovi – June 22
 Mary J. Blige
 Kenny Chesney
 John Mayer
 Alex Britti September 24 (aired September 29)
 Ne-Yo
 Joss Stone
 Maroon 5

2008
Julieta Venegas – Estudios Churubusco, Mexico City, March 6 (See also MTV Unplugged)
Söhne Mannheims vs. Xavier Naidoo – Schlosstheater Schwetzingen, Germany, July 2
Amy Winehouse

2009
 Sportfreunde Stiller
 Adele
 Silversun Pickups
 All Time Low
 Paramore
 Katy Perry – NEP Midtown Studios, New York City, July 22, 2009 (See also MTV Unplugged)
 Ayaka – Osaka-jō Hall, Osaka, Japan, November 18
 The Script
 Wilki
 Tomoya Nagase

2010
Vampire Weekend
Sido
Despina Vandi
Adam Lambert
Trey Songz
The Script
Phoenix
Mando Diao
Kult
Panda
Camila
B.o.B
Train

2011
Thirty Seconds to Mars – May 13, New York City
Zoé
Lykke Li – April 7
Los Tigres del Norte – May 24 at Hollywood Palladium in Los Angeles, CA
Lil Wayne – June 12 
Salyu – June 13 Billboard Live TOKYO
Mumford & Sons – June 24

2012
Florence and the Machine  with guest appearance by Josh Homme–April 2 at Angel Orensanz Center, New York (See also: MTV Unplugged)
Walk the Moon –  August 2
Rita Ora – September 7
Juanes – February 1st

2013
 Scorpions - Athens, Greece

2014
Gentleman
Miley Cyrus – January 29
Kinky – June 3
Pepe Aguilar – June 5

2015
Cro - July 3
Placebo - August 19
Enrique Bunbury - September 1

2016
Mika Nakashima - January 10
Miguel Bosé - May 12
Mizuki Nana - October 23

2017
O.S.T.R. - March 20
Emmanuel - June 15
A-ha - Ocean Sound Recordings, Giske, Norway, October 3 (See also MTV Unplugged – Summer Solstice)
Shawn Mendes - The Theatre at Ace Hotel, Los Angeles (See also MTV Unplugged)
Bleachers featuring Lorde and Carly Rae Jepsen - The Stone Pony, Asbury Park, New Jersey

2018
Molotov - April 12
Los Auténticos Decadentes - May 24
Biffy Clyro - May 25, Recorded at Roundhouse (venue), London
Gang of Youths - July 25, Recorded at Cobblestone Pavilion, Melbourne
DMA's – October 11, Recorded at Memo Music Hall, Melbourne, (See also MTV Unplugged: Live (DMA's album))

2019
 Café Tacuba – March 5, Sala Nezahualcóyotl, Centro Cultural Universitario, CDMX.
 Liam Gallagher – August 3, Recorded at Hull City Hall, Hull

2020
In light of the COVID-19 pandemic, MTV rebranded the show to MTV Unplugged at Home, as part of the network's #AloneTogether campaign, a social media initiative created to encourage the practice of social distancing among young people "in the hope of 'flattening the curve'" of the outbreak. It became an online series instead, with episodes released on MTV's YouTube, Instagram, and Twitter accounts, and featured a mix of local and international artists performing from their respective homes around the world.
 Wyclef Jean – March 20. Jean was the first artist to perform under the new At Home format
 JoJo – March 25
 Yungblud – April 1, Los Angeles
 Alessia Cara – April 3. Cara was the first artist featured after MTV announced the official launch of At Home as a livestreaming series earlier that same day.
 Melissa Etheridge
 Finneas O'Connell
 Jewel
 Shaggy
 Kiana Ledé
 Monsta X
 Bazzi
 Marcus Mumford
 CNCO
 Hayley Kiyoko
 Fobia – October 2, Frontón Mexico in Mexico City. The band was the first to record under the concert-without-an-audience format for the show. The location of the performance was not disclosed at the time to avoid crowds outside the venue.
 Miley Cyrus – October 16, Los Angeles

2021
 BTS – February 23, South Korea
 Tony Bennett and Lady Gaga – aired December 16
 Bastille with Charlie Barnes – aired December 23

2022
 Twenty One Pilots – aired June 9

European MTV

 Phil Collins (1994)

Brazilian Acústico MTV

Grammy awards and nominations received for Unplugged

Won
1993 – 35th Grammy Awards to Eric Clapton
Grammy Award for Album of the Year – Unplugged1995 – 37th Grammy Awards to Tony Bennett
Grammy Award for Album of the Year – MTV Unplugged: Tony Bennett1996 – 38th Grammy Awards to Nirvana
Best Alternative Music Album – MTV Unplugged in New York2000 – Latin Grammy Awards of 2000 to Shakira
Best Female Rock Vocal Performance – "Octavo Día"
Best Female Pop Vocal Performance – "Ojos Así"
2000 – Latin Grammy Awards of 2000 to Os Paralamas do Sucesso
Best Brazilian Rock Album – Acústico MTV2001 – 43rd Grammy Awards to Shakira
Best Latin Pop Album – Unplugged2002 – Latin Grammy Awards of 2002 to Cássia Eller
Best Brazilian Rock Album – Acústico MTV2007 – Latin Grammy Awards of 2007 to Ricky Martin
Best Pop Vocal Album, Male – "Unplugged"
Best Long Form Music Video – "Unplugged"
2007 – Latin Grammy Awards of 2007 to Lobão
Best Brazilian Rock Album – Acústico MTV2007 – Latin Grammy Awards of 2007 to Lenine
Best Brazilian Contemporary Pop Album – Acústico MTV2007 – Latin Grammy Awards of 2007 to Zeca Pagodinho
Best Album Samba/Pagode – Acústico MTV – 2 Gafieira2008 – Latin Grammy Awards of 2008 to Julieta Venegas
Best Alternative Album – "Unplugged"
Best Long Form Music Video – "Unplugged"
2008 – Latin Grammy Awards of 2008 to Paulinho da Viola
Best Album Samba/Pagode – Acústico MTVNominations
2000 – 42nd Grammy Awards to Maná
Best Latin Pop Album – Unplugged2000 – Latin Grammy Awards of 2000 to Shakira
Album of the Year – UnpluggedBest Pop Vocal Album – UnpluggedBest Short Form Music Video – "Ojos Así"
2003 – 45th Grammy Awards to Lauryn Hill
Best Female Rap Solo Performance – "Mystery of Iniquity"
2003 – Latin Grammy Awards of 2003 to Kid Abelha
Best Brazilian Contemporary Pop Album – Acústico MTV2006 – 48th Grammy Awards to Alicia Keys
Best R&B Album – UnpluggedBest Female R&B Vocal Performance – "Unbreakable"
Best R&B Song – "Unbreakable"
Best Traditional R&B Vocal Performance – "If I Was Your Woman"
2007 – Latin Grammy Awards of 2008 to Ricky Martin
Album of the Year – Unplugged''
Record of the Year – "Tu Recuerdo"
2008 – Latin Grammy Awards of 2008 to Julieta Venegas
Record of the Year – "El Presente"
Song of the Year – "El Presente"

References

Mtv Unplugged